Benoit Lesoimier (born 21 February 1983) is a French former professional footballer who played as a midfielder.

References

External links

People from Saint-Lô
1983 births
Living people
French footballers
Stade Malherbe Caen players
Clermont Foot players
ES Troyes AC players
Stade Brestois 29 players
AC Ajaccio players
Ligue 1 players
Ligue 2 players
Association football midfielders
Sportspeople from Manche
Footballers from Normandy